Aan de Doorns is a small settlement on the Nuy River, about 7 km south east of Worcester in the Western Cape, South Africa. 

The name is of Dutch origin and literally mean "at the thorns".

See also 

Aandedoorns Website

References 
 Raper, Peter Edmund. 2004. New Dictionary of South African Place Names. Johannesburg & Cape Town: Jonathan Ball Publishers.

Populated places in the Breede Valley Local Municipality